The 1934 Colorado Agricultural Aggies football team represented Colorado Agricultural College (now known as Colorado State University) in the Rocky Mountain Conference (RMC) during the 1934 college football season.  In their 24th season under head coach Harry W. Hughes, the Aggies compiled a 6–2–1 record (6–1–1 against RMC opponents), tied for the RMC championship, and outscored all opponents by a total of 173 to 67.

Three Colorado Agricultural players received all-conference honors in 1934: halfback Wilbur (Red) White, center Floyd Mencimer, and end Chet Cruikshank.

Schedule

References

Colorado Agricultural
Colorado State Rams football seasons
Rocky Mountain Athletic Conference football champion seasons
Colorado Agricultural Aggies football